Aswani Kiran (born 15 May 1985) is a former Indian female volleyball player who has also captained the India women's national volleyball team internationally. She was selected to represent India at the 2010 Asian Games, captained the national team at the 2010 Asian Games and was part of the squad which finished 9th in the women's team event.

References 

1985 births
Living people
Indian women's volleyball players
Volleyball players at the 2010 Asian Games
Asian Games competitors for India
Volleyball players from Kerala